Ryan Duane Couture (born August 27, 1982) is an American professional mixed martial artist who most recently competed in the Welterweight division of Bellator MMA. A professional competitor since 2009, he has formerly competed for the UFC and Strikeforce. He is the son of UFC Hall of Famer Randy Couture.

Biography
Couture grew up in Woodinville, Washington and attended Woodinville High School. During his senior year, Couture placed third in the Washington State 4A wrestling championship. Couture attended Western Washington University from 2000 until 2004 and graduated with a degree in mathematics. Before he began pursuing an MMA career, Couture worked at a bank, and trained with Nicolas Lipari.

Mixed martial arts career
Couture began fighting in 2009 and compiled a 5–1–1 record as an amateur.

Strikeforce
He made his professional debut at Strikeforce Challengers: Riggs vs. Taylor on August 13, 2010. He debuted in the Strikeforce promotion's lightweight division, defeating Lucas Stark via triangle choke in the first round.

Couture was scheduled to fight Juan Zapata on November 19, 2010, however he was forced to withdraw because of a staph infection.

Couture fought at Strikeforce Challengers: Beerbohm vs. Healy against Lee Higgins and won the bout via rear-naked choke in the 3rd round. The victory over Higgins upped Couture's professional record to 2–0, with both fights coming under the Strikeforce banner.

In his next fight, Couture faced Matt Ricehouse at Strikeforce Challengers: Fodor vs. Terry. He lost via unanimous decision.

Couture rebounded from the first loss of his career when he defeated Maka Watson via majority decision at Strikeforce Challengers: Larkin vs. Rossborough.

Couture next faced Conor Heun at Strikeforce: Tate vs. Rousey on March 3, 2012.  He defeated Heun by TKO at 2:52 in the third round.

In his sixth Strikeforce appearance, Couture faced Joe Duarte on July 14, 2012 at Strikeforce: Rockhold vs. Kennedy.  He won the fight via split decision.

Having spent his entire professional career in the Strikeforce promotion, Couture was featured on their final show as he faced former EliteXC World Lightweight Champion. K. J. Noons at Strikeforce: Marquardt vs. Saffiedine on January 12, 2013. Despite being outstruck by Noons in each round, Couture was awarded a split decision victory.

Ultimate Fighting Championship
Following a signing of his father Randy to Bellator as an on-screen, non-fighting personality, UFC president Dana White, was questioned about what type of relationship Couture now had with the UFC, as White was quite upset at a perceived betrayal by Randy. White made it clear that Couture is welcome in the UFC, and that he will not be punished for his father's relationship with him. However, White did state that Randy will not be allowed to corner his son at UFC events.

In his UFC debut, Couture faced Ross Pearson on April 6, 2013 at UFC on Fuel TV 9. Couture lost the bout via TKO in the second round.

Couture was expected to face Quinn Mulhern in a lightweight bout on August 31, 2013 at UFC 164.  However, Mulhern pulled out of the bout in mid-July citing an injury and was replaced by Al Iaquinta. He lost the bout via unanimous decision. After back to back losses he was released from the UFC.

Independent promotions
Couture returned to the cage on the smaller circuit and he has since rattled off 2 straight victories, both being finishes defeating Kyle Sjafiroeddin by rear naked choke in the first round on January 18, 2014 at Battlegrounds MMA 3. Then defeating Shakir McKillip with the same method early in the second round on May 17, 2014 at Battlegrounds MMA 4.

Bellator MMA
On July 27, 2014, Couture signed with Bellator MMA.

Couture made his promotional debut against Tom Bagnasco at Bellator 124 on September 12, 2014. He won the fight via rear-naked choke submission in the first round.

Couture faced Dakota Cochrane at Bellator 135 on March 27, 2015. He won the bout via a rear-naked choke submission in the first round.

Couture was scheduled to face Nick Gonzalez on September 25, 2015 at Bellator 143.  However, Gonzalez weighed in at 172.75 pounds, over sixteen pounds past the lightweight limit, and the fight was cancelled.

Couture was expected to face Derek Anderson at Bellator 148 on January 29, 2016.  However, Anderson was injured and replaced by Patricky Pitbull.  Couture lost the bout via knockout in the first round.

Couture faced Goiti Yamauchi at Bellator 162 on October 21, 2016. He lost the fight via submission just over a minute into the first round.

Couture faced Haim Gozali in a welterweight bout at Bellator 180 on June 24, 2017. He won the fight via unanimous decision.
 
Couture faced Saad Awad at Bellator 201 on June 29, 2018. He lost the bout via technical knockout in the first round.

Couture faced Haim Gozali in a rematch at Bellator 209 on November 16, 2018. He won the bout via unanimous decision.

Personal life
Couture currently lives in Las Vegas, Nevada and trains at the Xtreme Couture gym. He got married in Las Vegas, NV in October 2014. He and his wife had a son in May 2021. 

In 2020, he announced that he had been appointed to be his father's successor as the CEO of Xtreme Couture. In the same interview Ryan mentioned that he is most likely retired from professional mixed martial arts competition.

Mixed martial arts record

|Win
|align=center|12–6
|Haim Gozali
|Decision (unanimous)
|Bellator 209
|
|align=center| 3
|align=center| 5:00
|Tel Aviv, Israel
|
|-
|Loss
|align=center|11–6
|Saad Awad
|TKO (punches)
|Bellator 201
|
|align=center| 1
|align=center| 4:29
|Temecula, California, United States
|
|-
|Win
|align=center| 11–5
|Haim Gozali
|Decision (unanimous)
|Bellator 180
|
|align=center|3
|align=center|5:00
|New York City, New York, United States
|
|-
|Loss
|align=center| 10–5
|Goiti Yamauchi
|Submission (armbar)
|Bellator 162
|
|align=center|1
|align=center|1:01
|Memphis, Tennessee, United States
|
|-
| Loss
| align=center| 10–4 
| Patricky Pitbull
| KO (punch)
| Bellator 148
| 
| align=center| 1
| align=center| 3:00
| Fresno, California, United States
| 
|-
| Win
| align=center| 10–3 
| Dakota Cochrane
| Submission (rear-naked choke)
| Bellator 135
| 
| align=center| 1
| align=center| 3:23
| Thackerville, Oklahoma, United States
| 
|-
| Win
| align=center| 9–3 
| Tom Bagnasco
| Submission (rear-naked choke)
| Bellator 124
| 
| align=center| 1
| align=center| 3:01
| Plymouth Township, Michigan, United States
| 
|-
| Win
| align=center| 8–3 
| Shakir McKillip
| Submission (rear-naked choke)
| Battlegrounds MMA 4
| 
| align=center| 2
| align=center| 1:34
| Enid, Oklahoma, United States
| 
|-
| Win
| align=center| 7–3 
| Kyle Sjafiroeddin
| Submission (rear-naked choke)
| Battlegrounds MMA 3
| 
| align=center| 1
| align=center| 2:14
| Norman, Oklahoma, United States
| 
|-
| Loss
| align=center| 6–3
| Al Iaquinta
| Decision (unanimous)
| UFC 164
| 
| align=center| 3
| align=center| 5:00
| Milwaukee, Wisconsin, United States
| 
|-
| Loss
| align=center| 6–2
| Ross Pearson
| TKO (punches)
| UFC on Fuel TV: Mousasi vs. Latifi
| 
| align=center| 2
| align=center| 3:45
| Stockholm, Sweden
| 
|-
| Win
| align=center| 6–1
| K. J. Noons
| Decision (split)
| Strikeforce: Marquardt vs. Saffiedine
| 
| align=center| 3
| align=center| 5:00
| Oklahoma City, Oklahoma, United States
| 
|-
| Win
| align=center| 5–1
| Joe Duarte
| Decision (split)
| Strikeforce: Rockhold vs. Kennedy
| 
| align=center| 3
| align=center| 5:00
| Portland, Oregon, United States
| 
|-
| Win
| align=center| 4–1
| Conor Heun
| TKO (punches)
| Strikeforce: Tate vs. Rousey
| 
| align=center| 3
| align=center| 2:52
| Columbus, Ohio, United States
| 
|-
| Win
| align=center| 3–1
| Maka Watson
| Decision (majority)
| Strikeforce Challengers: Larkin vs. Rossborough
| 
| align=center| 3
| align=center| 5:00
| Las Vegas, Nevada, United States
| 
|-
| Loss
| align=center| 2–1
| Matt Ricehouse
| Decision (unanimous)
| Strikeforce Challengers: Fodor vs. Terry
| 
| align=center| 3
| align=center| 5:00
| Kent, Washington, United States
| 
|-
| Win
| align=center| 2–0
| Lee Higgins
| Submission (rear-naked choke)
| Strikeforce Challengers: Beerbohm vs. Healy
| 
| align=center| 3
| align=center| 4:41
| Cedar Park, Texas, United States
| 
|-
| Win
| align=center| 1–0
| Lucas Stark
| Submission (triangle choke)
| Strikeforce Challengers: Riggs vs. Taylor
| 
| align=center| 1
| align=center| 1:15
| Phoenix, Arizona, United States
|

See also
 List of Strikeforce alumni

References

External links
 
 

Living people
1982 births
American male mixed martial artists
Mixed martial artists from Washington (state)
Lightweight mixed martial artists
Mixed martial artists utilizing wrestling
People from Edmonds, Washington
Western Washington University alumni
Ultimate Fighting Championship male fighters